Albert Ernest "Dutch" Mele (January 11, 1915 – February 12, 1975) was a professional baseball player.  He was an outfielder for one season (1937) with the Cincinnati Reds.  For his career, he compiled a .143 batting average in 14 at-bats, with one runs batted in.

Mele played 17 seasons in minor league baseball (nine with the Syracuse Chiefs), hitting 244 home runs.  He was born in New York City and later died in Hollywood, Florida at the age of 60.

External links

1915 births
1975 deaths
Cincinnati Reds players
Major League Baseball outfielders
Baseball players from New York (state)
Wheeling Stogies players
Joplin Miners players
Muskogee Tigers players
Milwaukee Brewers (minor league) players
Muskogee Reds players
Durham Bulls players
Baltimore Orioles (IL) players
Birmingham Barons players
Syracuse Chiefs players
Jersey City Giants players
Ottawa Giants players
Burials at Saint Raymond's Cemetery (Bronx)